Warren Niesłuchowski (October 11, 1946 – June 17, 2019) was an American-Polish artist, writer, editor, translator and Vietnam War deserter who "inspired philosophical questions for many about home, exile, and family." According to ArtReview, his "nomadic lifestyle came to be considered as an artwork in itself."

Early life 
Born in a displaced person camp in Germany to a Polish-Ukrainian couple, Niesłuchowski's family immigrated to the United States and he was raised in New Bedford, Massachusetts.

Legacy 
In 2020, Joanna Warsza and Sina Najafi curated the exhibition “And Warren Niesłuchowski Was There: Guest, Host, Ghost” about Niesłuchowski's life. The exhibition opened at Cabinet magazine's event space in Berlin before traveling to the Foksal Gallery Foundation in Warsaw. A book of the same title was co-published that year by Cabinet Books and the Museum of Modern Art in Warsaw.

References

https://wyborcza.pl/7,112588,24961812,zmarl-warren-niesluchowski-wielki-oryginal-swiata-sztuki-znal.html

1946 births
2019 deaths
Polish emigrants to the United States
Explorers of Europe
Explorers of North America
Explorers of Asia
Vietnam War draft evaders
People from New Bedford, Massachusetts